Jim Hanna is an American comedy writer. He has written for Dennis Miller Live, for which he shared a 1994 Primetime Emmy for Outstanding Writing for a Variety or Music Program.

References

External links
 

American television writers
American male television writers
Living people
Emmy Award winners
Year of birth missing (living people)
Place of birth missing (living people)